Luigi Renato Bacigalupo (8 July 1908 – 6 October 1979) was an Italian freestyle swimmer. He competed at the 1924 Summer Olympics in the 1500 m and 4×200 m relay, but failed to reach the finals. His elder brother was also named Luigi and was also a competitive freestyle swimmer.

References

1908 births
1979 deaths
Italian male freestyle swimmers
Swimmers at the 1924 Summer Olympics
Italian male swimmers
Olympic swimmers of Italy
20th-century Italian people